Tinosu or Pisculeşti was the location of a Dacian fortified town, occupied sometime between the 2nd century BCE to 1st century CE.

Located on the eastern bank of the Prahova River, the town was fortified with a fosse and wall topped with a palisade. The site was excavated by Cezar Bolliac in the 1860s. Discoveries of Getic and Roman coins from the reign of Claudius have allowed archaeologists to date its occupation.

References 

Dacian fortresses in Prahova County
History of Muntenia